Steven Dwayne Burtt Jr. (born March 7, 1984) is an American-born naturalized Ukrainian professional basketball player. After four years at Iona, Burtt entered the 2006 NBA draft but was not selected.

High school career
Burtt played high school basketball at Rice High School, in New York City, New York.

College career
As of April 2015, Burtt is Iona’s second all-time leader in scoring with 2,034 points, behind his father Steve Burtt Sr. They are one of just two father-son duos to score 2,000 points each in NCAA Division I basketball, the other being Dell Curry and Steph Curry. In 2012, he was inducted in Iona basketball Hall of Fame. Burtt was named first team All-MAAC in 2006, second team All-MAAC in 2005 and third team All-MAAC in 2004.

Professional career
On March 5, 2009, Burtt signed with Vive Menorca of Spain. On April 28, 2009, he was released by Menorca.

In the summer of 2009, he signed with Apollon Limassol of Cyprus. In January 2010, he moved to Ukraine and signed with BC Ferro-ZNTU for the remainder of the season.

In August 2010, he signed with BC Dnipro of Ukraine. In July 2011, he re-signed with Dnipro for one more season.

In July 2012, he signed a 1+1 contract with Tofaş of Turkey. In January 2013, he parted ways with Tofaş. In March 2013, he moved to Russia and signed with Avtodor Saratov for the rest of the season.

On September 26, 2013, he signed with Spartak Saint Petersburg of Russia for the 2013–14 season.

On July 31, 2014, Burtt signed with Stelmet Zielona Góra of Poland. On December 5, 2014, he left Zielona Góra and signed a two-year deal with Baloncesto Fuenlabrada of Spain. On April 13, 2015, he left Fuenlabrada and signed with Atléticos de San Germán of Puerto Rico for the rest of the 2015 BSN season.

On August 21, 2015, he signed with Byblos Club of Lebanon. In May 2016, he signed in China with the Guizhou White Tigers for the 2016 NBL season.

On February 10, 2017, Burtt signed with the Greek club Apollon Patras.
On March 31, 2018, Burtt moved to Faros Larissas, after stints in Lebanon, Puerto Rico and Iran. On May 10, 2018 Burtt signed with Ionikos Nikaias B.C., but the deal never came through. On September 26, 2018, he joined another Greek team, the Rethymno Cretan Kings.

On October 28, 2020, Burtt signed with Budivelnyk of the Ukrainian Basketball Super League.

National team career
In 2011, Burtt acquired Ukrainian citizenship and represented the senior Ukrainian national team at EuroBasket 2011.

The Basketball Tournament
Steve Burtt played for Gael Nation in the 2018 edition of The Basketball Tournament. In two games, he averaged 16.5 points, 2.5 assists, and 2 rebounds per game. Gael Nation reached the second round before falling to Armored Athlete.

Personal life
Burtt is the son of former Iona College and NBA player Steve Burtt Sr. He received a degree from Iona in Marketing.

References

External links
ACB.com Profile
Euroleague.net Profile
Eurobasket.com Profile
FIBA.com Profile
TBLStat.net Profile

1984 births
Living people
African-American basketball players
American emigrants to Ukraine
American expatriate basketball people in China
American expatriate basketball people in Cyprus
American expatriate basketball people in Greece
American expatriate basketball people in Iran
American expatriate basketball people in Israel
American expatriate basketball people in Italy
American expatriate basketball people in Lebanon
American expatriate basketball people in Poland
American expatriate basketball people in Portugal
American expatriate basketball people in Russia
American expatriate basketball people in Spain
American expatriate basketball people in Turkey
American expatriate basketball people in Ukraine
American men's basketball players
Apollon Patras B.C. players
Atléticos de San Germán players
Baloncesto Fuenlabrada players
Basketball players from New York City
Basket Zielona Góra players
BC Avtodor Saratov players
BC Dnipro players
BC Spartak Saint Petersburg players
BC Zaporizhya players
Caciques de Humacao players
Gymnastikos S. Larissas B.C. players
Iona Gaels men's basketball players
Ionikos Nikaias B.C. players
Ironi Ashkelon players
Israeli Basketball Premier League players
Liga ACB players
Menorca Bàsquet players
Naturalized citizens of Ukraine
Olympias Patras B.C. players
Point guards
Rethymno B.C. players
S.L. Benfica basketball players
Tofaş S.K. players
Ukrainian expatriate basketball people in Greece
Ukrainian expatriate basketball people in Iran
Ukrainian expatriate basketball people in Lebanon
Ukrainian expatriate basketball people in Poland
Ukrainian expatriate basketball people in Russia
Ukrainian expatriate basketball people in Spain
Ukrainian expatriate basketball people in Turkey
Ukrainian men's basketball players
Sagesse SC basketball players
21st-century African-American sportspeople
20th-century African-American people